Sally Rooney (born 20 February 1991) is an Irish author and screenwriter. She has published three novels: Conversations with Friends (2017), Normal People (2018), and Beautiful World, Where Are You (2021). Both Normal People and Conversations with Friends were adapted into television series by Hulu, RTÉ, Screen Ireland and the BBC, in 2020 and 2022, respectively. Rooney's work has garnered critical acclaim and commercial success, and she is regarded as one of the foremost millennial writers.

Early life and education
Rooney was born in Castlebar, County Mayo, in 1991, where she also grew up and lives today, after studying in Dublin and a stint in New York City. Her father, Kieran Rooney, worked for Telecom Éireann and her mother, Marie Farrell, ran an arts centre. Rooney has an older brother and a younger sister. She studied English at Trinity College Dublin (TCD), where she was elected a scholar in 2011. She started (but did not complete) a master's degree in politics there, completing a degree in American literature instead, and graduated with an MA in 2013.

While attending Trinity College Dublin, Rooney was a university debater and eventually became the top debater at the European Universities Debating Championships in 2013, later writing of the experience. Before becoming a writer, she worked for a restaurant in an administrative role.

Career

Early career
Rooney completed her first novel—which she has described as "absolute trash"—at the age of 15. Her first published work was two poems in The Stinging Fly, submitted to the magazine when she was still in secondary school. She began writing "constantly" in late 2014. She completed her debut novel, Conversations with Friends, while studying for her master's degree in American literature. She wrote 100,000 words of the book in three months.

In 2015, her essay "Even If You Beat Me", about her time as the "top competitive debater on the continent of Europe", was seen by an agent, Tracy Bohan, of the Wylie Agency, and Bohan contacted Rooney. Rooney gave Bohan a manuscript, and Bohan circulated it to publishers, receiving seven bids.

She had seen my story and wondered whether I had anything else she could read... But I didn’t send her anything for ages... I don’t know why. I didn't want her to see this shoddy draft.

Conversations with Friends (2017)

Rooney signed with Tracy Bohan of the Wylie Agency, and Conversations with Friends was subject to a seven-party auction for its publishing rights, which were eventually sold in 12 countries. The novel was published in June 2017 by Faber and Faber. It was nominated for the 2018 Swansea University International Dylan Thomas Prize, and the 2018 Folio Prize, and won the 2017 Sunday Times/Peters Fraser & Dunlop Young Writer of the Year Award.

In March 2017, her short story "Mr Salary" was shortlisted for the Sunday Times EFG Private Bank Short Story Award. In November 2017, Rooney was announced as editor of the Irish literary magazine The Stinging Fly. She was a contributing writer to the magazine. She oversaw the magazine's two issues in 2018, before handing the editorship over to Danny Denton. She remains a contributing editor to the magazine.

In 2018, Rooney was announced as taking part in the Cúirt International Festival of Literature.

Normal People (2018)

Rooney's second novel, Normal People, was published in September 2018, also by Faber & Faber. The novel grew out of Rooney's exploration of the history between the two main characters of her short story "At the Clinic", which was first published in London-based literary magazine The White Review in 2016. In July 2018, Normal People was longlisted for that year's Man Booker Prize. On 27 November 2018, the work won "Irish Novel of the Year" at the Irish Book Awards and was named Waterstones' Book of the Year for 2018. In January 2019, it won the Costa Book Award (formerly the Whitbread) for the Novel category. It was longlisted for the 2019 Dylan Thomas Prize and the 2019 Women's Prize for Fiction. It has been translated into 46 languages and earned praise from Barack Obama and Taylor Swift, among others.

Television adaptations 
Normal People was made into a 12-part series as a co-production of BBC Three and the online platform Hulu, with filming taking place in Dublin and County Sligo. The series was directed by Lenny Abrahamson and Hettie Macdonald. Daisy Edgar-Jones and Paul Mescal played Marianne and Connell, respectively. The series was a critical success and earned four Primetime Emmy Award nominations including for Outstanding Lead Actor in a Limited Series or Movie, Outstanding Directing for a Limited Series, and Outstanding Writing for a Limited Series.

In May 2022, the novel Conversations with Friends was also made into a 12-episode BBC Three/Hulu miniseries, with the same creative team that was behind Normal People. Director Lenny Abrahamson and co-writer Alice Birch worked on this adaptation, too.

Beautiful World, Where Are You (2021)

In April 2019, the New York Public Library's Dorothy and Lewis B. Cullman Center for Scholars and Writers announced its 2019 class of fellows, which included Rooney. The press release stated, "she will be writing a new novel under the working title Beautiful World, Where Are You, examining aesthetics and political crisis." The novel was published by Farrar, Straus and Giroux in the United States and by Faber in the UK and Ireland in September 2021.

Political views
Rooney describes herself as a feminist and a Marxist; both her parents are socialists and they instilled socialist values in Rooney.  

Rooney has said that her work has a Marxist character. Some literary critics have criticised this aspect: Madeleine Schwartz of The New York Review of Books has said of Rooney's works that "the politics are mostly gestural"; Becca Rothfeld of the literary magazine The Point wrote that Rooney's Marxism is no more than "fashionable posturing" and called her work "sanctimony literature" that is "full of self-promotion and the airing of performatively righteous opinions". Cody Delistraty, writing for Vulture, has unfavourably compared the anti-capitalist politics of Rooney's work to contemporary novelists such as Halle Butler, Tony Tulathimutte, and Ling Ma, opining that Rooney's characters ultimately simply accept the capitalist status quo rather than challenging it.  

The ending of Normal People, in which the working-class Connell emigrates to New York City to begin a creative writing course at New York University, was mocked by some critics as a "bourgeois" fantasy. Rooney retorted that those critics misunderstand class dynamics:

The feminist themes in Rooney's works have made them popular in China, where they are considered best sellers.

During the referendum on the legality of abortion in Ireland held in 2018, Rooney campaigned for a Yes vote.

Views on Israel
Rooney declined an offer from an Israeli publisher to translate Beautiful World, Where Are You into Hebrew, citing her support for the Palestinian-led Boycott, Divestment and Sanctions (BDS) movement. In October 2021, she said, "The Hebrew-language translation rights to my new novel are still available, and if I can find a way to sell these rights that is compliant with the BDS movement's institutional boycott guidelines, I will be very pleased and proud to do so". In retaliation, two Israeli bookshop chains announced a withdrawal of all of Rooney's titles from their shelves in early November. Rooney's Israeli publisher said it would continue selling her titles. Subsequently, in a letter organized by Artists for Palestine UK, 70 writers and publishers, including Kevin Barry, Rachel Kushner, Geoff Dyer, Pankaj Mishra, Carmen Callil, and Ahdaf Soueif, said they supported Rooney’s decision.

Television

Bibliography

Novels

Short fiction 
 
 
  Prototype of Marianne and Connell in later 2018 Normal People.

 
(First published in Granta 135: New Irish Writing Fiction 19 April 2016.)
 
(Also published in ) 
 Unread Messages. The New Yorker. 12 July 2021.

Poetry 
"Tírghrá". The Stinging Fly. Spring 2010. 
"Impossibilities". The Stinging Fly. Spring 2010.
"The Stillest Horse". The Stinging Fly. Winter 2012. 
"After a Road Traffic Accident, Chennai" . The Stinging Fly. Summer 2014.

Essays

Audiobooks 
 This audiobook contains unabridged readings of the stories  and  previously published in Granta and The New Yorker respectively.

Book reviews

Reception

 

 
 
 
 
 
 
"Sally Rooney’s 2017 “Conversations With Friends,” widely heralded as the first great novel of millennial life"

Awards
2017 The Sunday Times Young Writer of the Year
2018 Irish Book Awards Novel of the Year – Normal People
2018 Costa Book Awards – Normal People
2019 Encore Award – Normal People
2022 Dalkey Literary Awards – Beautiful World, Where Are You

Personal life
Rooney lives in her childhood hometown of Castlebar and is married to John Prasifka, a mathematics teacher.

References

1991 births
21st-century Irish novelists
21st-century Irish women writers
Alumni of Trinity College Dublin
Irish Marxist writers
Irish socialist feminists
Irish women novelists
Living people
People associated with Trinity College Dublin
People from Castlebar
Scholars of Trinity College Dublin